Scoglio is an Italian surname, meaning a rock or shoal. Notable people with it include:

Agatina Carmen Maria Scoglio (Tina Scala, born 1935), Italian-Irish actress and model, sister of Giovanna
Caterina Scoglio, Italian network scientist and computer engineer
Franco Scoglio (1941–2005), Italian football manager
Giovanna Scoglio (Gia Scala, 1934–1972), Italian-Irish actress and model, sister of Agatina